White v. Samsung Electronics America, Inc., 971 F.2d 1395 (9th Cir. 1992); 989 F.2d 1512 (9th Cir. 1993), is a 1992 and 1993 case of the United States Court of Appeals for the Ninth Circuit upholding a cause of action on the part of TV show personality Vanna White against Samsung for depicting a robot on a Wheel of Fortune–style set in a humorous advertisement.

Facts
Wheel of Fortune hostess Vanna White had established herself as a TV personality, and consequently appeared as a spokesperson for advertisers. Samsung produced a television commercial advertising its VCRs, showing a robot wearing a dress and with other similarities to White standing beside a Wheel of Fortune game board. Samsung, in their own internal documents, called this the "Vanna White ad". White sued Samsung for violations of California Civil Code section 3344, California common law right of publicity, and the federal Lanham Act. The United States District Court for the Southern District of California granted summary judgment against White on all counts, and White appealed.

Result
The Ninth Circuit reversed the District Court, finding that White had a cause of action based on the value of her image, and that Samsung had appropriated this image. Samsung's assertion that this was a parody was found to be unavailing, as the intent of the ad was not to make fun of White's characteristics, but to sell VCRs.

Judge Alex Kozinski dissented from an order rejecting the suggestion for rehearing en banc an appeal filed by Vanna White, stating "All creators draw in part on the work of those who came before, referring to it, building on it, poking fun at it; we call this creativity, not piracy."

An extended extract from the opinion is widely quoted:

Kozinski's dissent in White is also famous for his sarcastic remark that "for better or worse, we are the Court of Appeals for the Hollywood Circuit".

Aftermath
Following the appeals, White returned to the District Court, and was ultimately awarded $403,000 for the use of her image.

References

United States Court of Appeals for the Ninth Circuit cases
1993 in United States case law
Personality rights